Weilersteußlingen is a small village in the Alb-Donau district, in Baden-Württemberg, Germany. It is part of the municipality Allmendingen. Population: 350

Villages in Baden-Württemberg